Beatty is a rural locality  in the Australian state of South Australia located in the state's east within the Murray and Mallee region about  north-east of the state capital of Adelaide and about  north  of the municipal seat of Mannum.

It was established in March 2003, when boundaries were formalised for the "long established local name".  It consists of approximately the northern half of the cadastral Hundred of Beatty.

The 2016 Australian census which was conducted in August 2016 reports that Beatty had a population of eight people.

Beatty  is located within the federal division of Barker, the state electoral district of Chaffey and the local government area of the  Mid Murray Council.

References

Towns in South Australia